The Southern rufous hornbill (Buceros mindanensis), is a large species of hornbill endemic to the Philippines. It inhabits Mindanao, Dinagat, Siargao, Balut, Bucas, Talikud and Basilan islands of the Philippines. It prefers rainforest habitats and eats fruits, small animals, insects, and seeds. It is threatened by hunting, illegal pet trade, and use of biological resources in their habitat which all leads to their population declining.

Biology
The Southern Rufous Hornbill was formerly a subspecies of the Rufous Hornbill. The outer half of the Southern rufous hornbill's bill is marked with a pale yellow. The species measures approximately 60–65 cm. The males weigh around 1,345–1,612 g. and the females around 1,413–1,662 g. Although the females may be slightly heavier than the males.

References

mindanensis
Birds of the Philippines
Birds of Mindanao
Birds described in 1877